Spring in Park Lane is a 1948 British romantic comedy film produced and directed by Herbert Wilcox and starring Anna Neagle, Michael Wilding and Tom Walls. It was part of a series of films partnering Neagle and Wilding. It was the top film at the British box office in 1948 and remains the most popular entirely British-made film ever in terms of all-time attendance. It was shot at the Elstree Studios of MGM British with sets designed by the art director William C. Andrews. Some location shooting also took place in London.

Plot
A footman, Richard, is employed by Joshua Howard, an eccentric art collector. His niece and secretary, Judy, has her doubts that Richard is the footman he pretends to be. In fact, he is Lord Brent, brother of one of Judy's suitors - George, the Marquess of Borechester.

Prior to his arrival in the Howard domestic household, Richard went to America to sell some old paintings to restore his aristocratic family's fortunes, but on the way back received a message that the cheque he was given for the paintings is invalid.  Richard subsequently decided to 'hide' until he saved enough money to return to America.  Over time as a footman, Judy notices how knowledgeable Richard is about many cultural things from art, poetry, music and dancing and begins to suspect he is not who he says he is. Things become interesting when his brother visits as one of Judy's suitors.

Through their various interactions, Richard and Judy fall in love, and as he is about to return to America they discover that the cheque for his family's paintings was valid after all.

Cast
 Anna Neagle as Judy, niece and secretary to Mr Howard
 Michael Wilding as "Richard" 
 Tom Walls as Joshua Howard, Judy's wealthy uncle
 Peter Graves as Basil Maitland, an actor and suitor to Judy
 Marjorie Fielding as Mildred Howard, Judy's mother
 Nigel Patrick as Mr Bacon, an 'art-dealer' (con-man)
 G. H. Mulcaster as Perkins, the butler
 Josephine Fitzgerald as Mrs Kate O'Malley, the cook
 Lana Morris as Rosie, the maid
 Nicholas Phipps as George, The Marquess of Borechester and Richard's elder brother (Phipps also wrote the screenplay)
 Catherine Paul as The Marchioness of Borechester and George & Richard's mother

Reception

Box-office
Spring in Park Lane was the most successful film release of 1948 in the United Kingdom. According to Kinematograph Weekly the "biggest winner" at the box office in 1948 Britain was The Best Years of Our Lives with Spring in Park Lane being the British film with the largest box-office and "runners up" being It Always Rains on Sunday, My Brother Jonathan, Road to Rio, Miranda, An Ideal Husband, The Naked City, The Red Shoes, Green Dolphin Street, Forever Amber, Life with Father, The Weaker Sex, Oliver Twist, The Fallen Idol and The Winslow Boy.

It reportedly recouped £280,193 in the UK.

In a 2004 survey by the BFI it was rated 5th in the all-time attendance figures for the United Kingdom, with total attendance of 20.5 million, still the largest figure for a wholly British made film. Wilcox claimed the film earned £1,600,000 at the British box office.

Reviews
Reviews were generally positive, Variety said, "incident upon incident carry merry laughter through the picture". and The New York Times described it as "attractively witty".

A follow up, Maytime in Mayfair, was released the following year.

One memorable scene presents Tom Walls and a group of guests including (scriptwriter) Nicholas Phipps (re-christened Lord Borechester/Dorchester/Porchester at various points in the film) smoking cigars and exchanging jokes after a dinner party. Phipps' character begins an endless (and completely unfunny) would-be joke about 'Two Tommies - not in the last war - the LAST war' going back to their billets 'in the evening - after the day!'. As the joke drones on faces fall until the outraged Walls cuts in with 'Shall we join the ladies?'. The joke was briefly reprised (but never concluded) in the Wilding/Neagle follow-up 'Maytime in Mayfair' (1949)  in which Walls re-appeared briefly as a policeman at the film's end. It was his last film role.

Soundtrack
Robert Farnon provides the soundtrack, his light orchestral version of the folk tune Early One Morning proving particularly popular at the time.

References

External links 
 
Review of film at Variety

1948 films
1948 romantic comedy films
British romantic comedy films
British black-and-white films
Films set in London
Films shot in London
Films directed by Herbert Wilcox
Films shot at MGM-British Studios
Films based on works by Alice Duer Miller
British Lion Films films
Remakes of British films
1940s English-language films
1940s British films